Pulling Teeth may refer to:
Dental extraction in dentistry
Pulling Teeth (band), a metal band from Baltimore, formed in 2005
(Anesthesia)—Pulling Teeth (Bass Solo), a bass solo by Cliff Burton on the 1983 Metallica album Kill 'Em All
"Pulling Teeth" (song), a song by Green Day from their 1994 album Dookie
Pulling Teeth (album), a 2000 album by Straight Faced